Local government law may refer to:

Local Autonomy Law, a Japanese statute
Local government in the United States
Local Government (Scotland) Act 1973